Between 23 May 2002 and 29 January 2003, 172 representatives filled the 150 seats of the House of Representatives, the lower house of the States-General of the Netherlands. Frans Weisglas was elected Speaker of the House of Representatives for this period.

The members were elected at the general election of 15 May 2002. After the election, the First Balkenende cabinet was formed for this term, consisting of Christian Democratic Appeal (CDA, 43 seats), Pim Fortuyn List (LPF, 26 seats) and People's Party for Freedom and Democracy (VVD, 24 seats). The opposition consisted of Labour Party (PvdA, 23 seats), GroenLinks (GL, 10 seats), Socialist Party (SP, 9 seats), Democrats 66 (D66, 7 seats), Christian Union (CU, 4 seats), Reformed Political Party (SGP, 2 seats) and Livable Netherlands (LN, 2 seats). LPF lost a seat during the term, when Harry Wijnschenk left and continued as an independent. 
Replacements were supplied from their party lists, so the resignation of individual members did not change the balance of power in the House of Representatives.

Pim Fortuyn was murdered shortly before the election, but remained on the list. Nancy Dankers and Cecilia van Weel-Niesten (both CDA), Margo Vliegenthart and Jan Pronk (both PvdA), Roger van Boxtel (D66), André Peperkoorn and Leon Geurts (both LPF) were all elected directly, but declined their appointment.

Members

Notes

References 

 

2002-2003